Mahan or Mahaan may refer to:

 Mahan (name)
 Mahan confederacy, chiefdoms in ancient Korea
 Mahan, Iran, a city in Kerman Province
 Mahan District, an administrative subdivision of Kerman Province
 Mahan Rural District, an administrative subdivision of Kerman Province
 Mahan, Hamadan, a village in Hamadan Province, Iran
 Mahan, Missouri, a community in the United States
 Mahan Air, an airline based in Kerman province
 Mahan Island, the conjoined Lanzarote and Fuerteventura in Canary Islands prehistory
 Master Mahan, a title of uncertain meaning, applied to Cain and his descendant Lamech in the Book of Moses
 Mahan (horse)
 Mahaan (1983 film), an Indian Hindi-language film
 Mahaan (2022 film), an Indian Tamil-language film

See also
 USS Mahan (disambiguation)
 McMahon